Anuradha is a 2014 Bollywood drama film directed by Raju Mavani starring Disha Chaudhary, Sachin Khedekar, Manoj Joshi, Hrishitaa Bhatt, Smita Jaykar,  and Kishori Shahane in lead roles. The film was released in India on 28 February 2014.

Plot
The Difficulties Faced by  Anuradha (Disha) on marrying Avinash the son of her fathers friend, Personal tragedy In the form of her Mother's Death and being Labelled as a loose woman By the society force anuradha to fight face the society, how she overcomes her trouble and proves her mettle forms the story.

Cast
 Disha Choudhary as Anuradha
 Rahul Jain as Avinash
 Manoj Joshi as Rudra
 Sachin Khedekar as Masterjee
 Kishori Shahane as Masterjee's Second wife
 Raju Mavani
 Hrishitaa Bhatt
 Smita Jaykar

Soundtrack
The music was composed by Farzan Faaiz and released by Shiv Shakti Entertainment Production. All lyrics were penned by Faaiz Anwar.

Critical reception
Anuradha received poor reviews from Indian film critics. Writing for the Times of India, Renuka Vyavahare gave the film 1.5 stars out of a possible 5. Vyavahare wrote, "You don’t identify or sympathise with the lead character or her dilemmas and there lies the film’s failure."

Box office
The film opened to 5% response in theatres and collected 1 lakh (100,000) rupees on its first day. Box Office India declared the film as Disaster.

See also
 Bollywood films of 2014

References

References
 Anuradha Movie: Review - Bollywood Hungama
 

2014 films
2010s Hindi-language films
Indian drama films
2014 drama films
Hindi-language drama films